Lena Luthor is a fictional comic book character in DC Comics. She is the sister of Superman's nemesis Lex Luthor. She was played by Cassidy Freeman in the television series Smallville and by Katie McGrath in the Arrowverse series Supergirl.

Publication history
Lena Luthor first appeared in Superman's Girl Friend, Lois Lane #23 and was created by Jerry Siegel and Kurt Schaffenberger.

Fictional character biography

Pre-Crisis version
In Silver Age continuity, Lena is Lex Luthor's younger sister. After Lex began his villainous career, his family changed their last name in shame to the anagram "Thorul" and told Lena that Lex had been killed in a mountain-climbing accident. Soon after this they were killed in an auto accident. As a result, Lena never knew she had an older brother, as Lex Luthor himself (with occasional help from Supergirl and Superman) worked to keep her from learning the truth. Lena appeared irregularly in DC Comics' from 1961 to 1975. Lena had psychic/empathic abilities, gained from touching a Space Brain that Luthor was experimenting on before he became a villain. In 1981, Lena lost her powers after brain surgery, and the decision was made to tell her the truth about Luthor. After the initial shock, there were signs of reconciliation after Luthor discovered he had unwittingly aided another criminal's conspiracy against Lena, and he was deeply apologetic.

Post-Crisis version

After Crisis on Infinite Earths, Lena Luthor is the daughter of Lex Luthor and Contessa Erica Del Portenza. She is named after Lex's foster sister who had been killed by their foster father, Casey Griggs. After Lena's birth, Lex takes advantage of Contessa Erica's wish to be unconscious at child birth by keeping her permanently drugged and unconscious at his corporate headquarters, not wishing to share his daughter's love with anyone else (although he himself avoids attending the birth to provide himself with a clear alibi for an assassination attempt he arranged at the time).

When Brainiac 13 arrives from the 64th century, the modern Brainiac possesses the infant Lena to escape being deleted by his future self. Even after Brainiac leaves Lena's body, Luthor trades her to Brainiac 13 for control of the future technology that has transformed Metropolis.

Lena returns to visit Lex Luthor during the Our Worlds at War crossover, where she has apparently been aged to adolescence by Brainiac 13. Lena plays a sneaky role during the event, helping Luthor and his allies beat Imperiex by feeding her father information, while secretly manipulating events to benefit Brainiac 13. She is ultimately convinced at the end to side with her father. At the end of the crossover, Brainiac 13 and Imperiex are both destroyed, and Lena is regressed to infanthood and returned to her father by Superman, who tells Luthor that he now has a second chance to try to be a man instead of a god.

Following Our Worlds At War, Lena appears infrequently, sometimes shown as still having Brainiac discs on her forehead.

In the Superman's Metropolis miniseries the artificial intelligence controlling the B-13 technology believes itself to be Lena Luthor. When it creates a human body (female, but bald) to pursue a romantic relationship with Jimmy Olsen, Superman confronts her with the real Lena Luthor, making her realize her personality is a computer simulation of Lena's.

Lena has not appeared since Luthor lost the presidency, and her current status is unknown.

Post-Infinite Crisis version
In Final Crisis: Legion of 3 Worlds #3, Legionnaires Polar Boy, Wildfire, and Dawnstar travel to Smallville during the 20th century, back to when Superman was still a suburban legend. The three heroes arrive to the Luthor household, where they hear a young Lex Luthor arguing with his father about his mother and sister.

In the revived Adventure Comics, Lena is Lex Luthor's younger sister and grew up alongside Lex until he left Smallville. Lex made certain to cover up his Smallville history, and that included disavowing a connection to his sister. Lena is now paralyzed, living in Smallville with her daughter Lori. Lori became friends with Superboy, but both were shocked to find Luthor on Lori's doorstep, intent on taking control of Superboy again and claiming he can cure Lena's condition. With Superboy's help Luthor indeed cures Lena, but he then undoes his cure, claiming he only helped her to prove to Superboy that he could and that so long as Superman lives, he will never reveal how he did it. Currently Lena is under the care of Wayne Enterprise doctors, thanks to Red Robin.

The New 52/DC Rebirth
In The New 52, Lena Luthor is paralyzed as a result of a childhood illness, with Luthor initially claiming to Bizarro that he never tried to save her because he was afraid of failure, only to admit privately later that he actually tried and failed to save her and instead left her paralyzed. He was eventually able to treat her paralysis, but delayed the treatment as it involved technology he did not invent himself, leaving Lena enraged that he expected her to be forever under his shadow.

Other versions

Supergirl: Cosmic Adventures in the Eighth Grade
Lena Thorul is a main character in the series. She is Lex Luthor's thirteen-year-old sister who attends the same boarding school as Supergirl. Lena hates superheroes, and specifically blames Supergirl for the recent misfortune that has befallen her brother (in the first issue Supergirl was accidentally responsible for Lex Luthor's capture). Unaware that Linda Lee is really Supergirl just as Linda is unaware that Lena Thorul is related to Lex Luthor, the two become best friends and roommates. Though sweet and fun when interacting with Linda (whom Lena perceives as an outsider, just like herself), Lena is hostile and suspicious towards everyone else. This is particularly true in regards to Linda's evil doppelganger Belinda Zee (Superiorgirl). As the series progresses, Lena's xenophobia becomes increasingly apparent. It is revealed that Lena is in secret communication with her older brother, waiting for the correct time to enact a complicated revenge scheme against Superman. When Linda'a identity is inadvertently exposed to Lena by the time-lost duplicate of Supergirl known as Supragirl, Lena goes over the edge and takes control of the minds of half the students in the school (the other half being transformed into Bizarro versions of themselves by Superiorgirl). Lena begins to question her hatred when confronted by the manipulations of reality by Mister Mxyzptlk and by Supergirl's willingness to save all of reality from the fifth dimensional imp. While Supergirl is battling Mxyzptlk, Lena is critically injured. Supergirl forces a truce between Luthor and Superman so that they can save Lena. Luthor saves his little sister, but the cost of her survival is that her hatred is now directed at her own brother. At the series end, Lena is referenced to be recovering in the hospital.

Lena Luthor (Earth-9)
A variation of the character appears in Tangent Comics: Wonder Woman #1 (September, 1998). Lena Thorul was an Element Girl scientist who saw the inevitable futility of the gender war between the Element Girl and Beast Boy Gothamites, in which she felt the Gothamites had lost touch with each other and with their true potential. That they were stronger as a race when the two sexes truly comprehend each other. Thorul sought to create a symbol of what the Gothamites could be if they were united as a people, through the use of outlawed technology, she successfully created a unique and powerful female Gothamite with the attributes of both the Element Girls and Beast Boys which she named her as Wanda. Upon revealing Wanda to the Gothamites as a symbol of unity, however, this was greeted with revulsion from the Gothamites who ironically agreed together that Wanda was an abomination and Thorul was immediately killed for creating her.

In other media

Television

Live action
Lena Luthor appeared in the Superboy TV series two-part story "Know Thine Enemy" with the young version played by Jennifer Hawkins and the adult version played by Denise Gossett. In the first part, Lena appears in flashbacks of Lex Luthor's childhood while Superboy experiences Lex's life through a device Luthor invented called a "psychodisk". Frequently abused by their father, Lex is very protective of Lena and tries to stop their father from beating her only to get a beating himself. Lex and Lena dream of one day escaping from their less-than-perfect home life. Eventually, Lex urges Lena to go spend the night at a friend's house and builds a bomb with which he plans to kill his parents while Lena is away. He has taken out a life insurance policy on them and plans to collect it after their deaths. He eventually does kill them, though the scene is not depicted because Superboy escapes the psychodisk recording before it can happen. In the second part, it revealed that Lena faked her own death and changed her name to escape the curse of the Luthor name, but she is found by Lana Lang. Her apparent death has driven Lex over the edge, causing him to construct a series of bombs that will wipe out all life on earth, leaving only android duplicates of himself and Lena on the planet. Because Lena is the only person Luthor claims to have ever loved, Lana believes she can stop his mad plan. Lena is taken to Luthor's underground hideout and attempts to get him to stop the countdown on his bombs. Luthor denies that he ever loved Lena, but the android duplicate of Lex stops the countdown with seconds to spare and attempts to get Lena to stay with him so they can have the better life they had always dreamed of. Lex deactivates the android and Lena leaves, never to be seen again.

A character based in Lena Luthor named Tess Mercer appears in the CW television series Smallville, portrayed by Cassidy Freeman and Leigh Bourke (young). The character's name is derived from two of Lex Luthor's female personal assistants in the films and comics, Eve Teschmacher and Mercy Graves, part of whose profession are also incorporated into the character's plotline.
Tess Mercer debuted on Smallvilles Season 8 premiere as Lex Luthor's protégé, who took over LuthorCorp as the acting CEO after Lex's disappearance. The final season of Smallville reveals that Tess Mercer is born Lutessa Lena Luthor as the illegitimate daughter of Lionel Luthor with Lex's nanny Pamela Jenkins (who had appeared in the season 1 episode "Crush"). Lionel left Lutessa at Granny Goodness's orphanage where Granny's powers were used to suppress Lutessa's memories of her true identity, and she was eventually adopted by the Mercer family in Louisiana under her father's arrangements. In the episode "Abandoned", Tess eventually learns the truth of her past once she reviews the orphanage's records and is distraught knowing that she's Lionel's daughter. In the series finale, Tess discovers from the fully revived Lex Luthor that he knew they are half-siblings all along. When Lex mortally stabs her (claiming it will save her from "turning into me"), Tess poisons Lex with a neurotoxin that erases all his memories, telling her brother as she dies that Clark Kent had already saved her from that dark fate.
After the television series' ten-season run ended in 2012, Smallville was continued through a comic book series named Season Eleven, written by Bryan Q. Miller, who also wrote for the show. The story sets six months after the television series finale, and Lutessa Luthor's death is ruled a suicide. However, Lex Luthor apparently has a ghostly encounter with her at a street corner of Metropolis. It is later reveals that Tess's consciousness bonded to Lex's mind when she poisoned him, forcing Lex to find a way of separating Tess from himself while he tries to regain his memories. Her friends eventually discover what happened, and extract her memories from Lex's mind and upload it to the Watchtower's computer as an AI until they can clone a new body for her. Tess's consciousness is eventually transferred into a new robotic form capable of flight and air manipulation, and she becomes the new Red Tornado and a member of the Justice League.

Lena Kieran Luthor appears in The CW series Supergirl, portrayed by Katie McGrath as an adult and by Lucy Loken as a teenager. She debuts in the season two premiere episode titled "The Adventures of Supergirl" and was promoted to a series regular for the third season. This version is initially depicted as the adoptive sister of Lex Luthor, but is later revealed to be his paternal half-sister through an affair that Lionel Luthor had. As the new CEO of Luthor Corp following her brother's incarceration, Lena moves to National City and rebrands the company as "L-Corp" to distance it and herself from Lex's reputation. Lex hires the assassin John Corben to kill her in retaliation, but Lena shoots him to save Alex Danvers. She later helps Kara Danvers find Veronica Sinclair, and in turn, Kara goes to a gala being held at L-Corp (as herself and Supergirl), later discovered to be a trap to robbers involved in a crime wave involving alien guns. Soon after, it is discovered that her mother was none other than the director of Project Cadmus, who plans to wipe out earth's entire alien population with an airborne substance. Lena turns on Lillian right before they are about to go through with the plan before revealing she switched out the substance and called the police. In the episode "Luthors", Lena discovers she is the product of an affair Lionel had with his mistress, before being framed by her mother for stealing kryptonite. She was then kidnapped by Lillian, ensuring the latter's escape alongside that of Metallo so she can use her to access one of Lex Luthor's storage areas before being rescued by Supergirl. In the episode "Ace Reporter", Lena reunites with her ex-boyfriend Jack Spheer, who is the CEO of Spheerical Industries and has invented a new nanobot technology called Biomax. When Kara discovers that Jack had been faking the human trials and injected himself with Biomax, Lena confronts him, only to find out he is being controlled by his CFO, Beth Breen. While Supergirl fights Jack, Lena fights Breen and destroys the control device and overloads the mainframe to save Supergirl, causing Jack to die, leaving Lena devastated. Later, Lena agrees to work with Rhea, unaware of her alien heritage, on a business project, a transmitter portal. Lena ends up forming a motherly bond with Rhea, who encourages her to be different than her family. Lena then finds out Rhea is an alien after she uses an alien element to finish the portal, but Rhea manages to convince her to continue working with her. Rhea then betrays Lena and uses the portal to bring her Daxamite fleet to Earth, then transports Lena and Mon-El to her ship. In the episode "Resist", Rhea forces Lena and Mon-El to get married, but they are saved by Supergirl, Lillian, and Cyborg Superman. In "Nevertheless, She Persisted", Lillian then reveals a device that Lex created to kill Kryptonians, but Lena and Winn modify it to kill Daxamites, killing Rhea and causing the fleet to retreat, saving the Earth. During Season Three, Lena Luthor develops a rivalry with Morgan Edge. When Morgan Edge poisoned Lena in the episode "For Good", Lilian Luthor plans revenge by targeting Morgan Edge. After Lena is cured of the poison, she has a moment with her mother as Lilian and Morgan are arrested by the authorities upon their respective defeats at the hands of Supergirl. Kara and Lena maintain a good friendship for most of the series until Lex Luthor reveals Supergirl's true identity to Lena, causing Lena to become bitter at this apparent 'evidence' that her friend didn't truly trust her. Lena initially attempted to use alien technology to basically brainwash most of humanity to remove their darker impulses, even spending the first half of the season pretending to have forgiven Kara's lie so that she could access the Fortress of Solitude,  but when she is forced to accept that the kind of mind-manipulation she is attempting is impossible, she rejects Lex's offer to join her in conquering the world and returns to help Supergirl instead. After Lex has been drained of his stolen powers, Lena uses Myriad to erase his knowledge of Kara's secret identity. The episode "Mxy in the Middle" revealed that Lena's late mother was Elizabeth Walsh (also portrayed by Katie McGrath) who was a witch.
 The episode "It's a Super Life", features Mxyzptlk showing Kara a range of alternate realities where she told Lena the truth about her identity on her own in an attempt to undo the subsequent deterioration of their relationship. However, each reality ultimately results in a worse outcome, ranging from Lena and Mon-El being killed by Reign or Agent Liberty blackmailing Kara into revealing her identity by threatening Lena. In a reality where Lena and Kara never met, Lena suffered an accident that left her gravely injured, which led to her being transformed into a Metallo-like equivalent by her mother.

Animation
 Romi Dames voices Lena Luthor in the webseries DC Super Hero Girls. While she is depicted as the sister of Lex Luthor, this version is a supervillain. In DC Super Hero Girls: Intergalactic Games, she is revealed to be resentful of the supers from Superhero High, Lena's particularly envious of Supergirl as she gained her powers when she landed on Earth while she had tried to do everything to gain her own powers, losing her hair (revealed to be a wig) in one of the processes. She is defeated by Wonder Woman and Platinum, who she uses for her plan. After failing her master Brainiac, she is left to drown in the truck taking her away. Big Barda saves her in exchange for help, but she turns her down. Lena is taken to prison afterwards.
 Dames reprises her role in the Lego DC Super Hero Girls series as the main antagonist. Unlike the main series, instead of avenging her brother's arrest at the hands of the heroes, she wishes to surpass him as a true supervillain, but she never succeeds. She's developed a series of Kryptomites with one of six different colors each, which effect everyone that comes near them by changing their emotions, such as anger, sadness, fear, distrust and forgetfulness, while the green ones only act as normal kryptonite that only affect Supergirl. She's usually seen assisting the Female Furies and Eclipso, though the latter of which Lena always hinders her plans in the end, hindering her own plan in the process.
 Cassandra Lee Morris voices Lena Luthor in the premiere of the 2019 DC Super Hero Girls TV series. She is again depicted both as the sister of Lex Luthor and as a villain, this time as a child. Her villainous ways in this version are not because of her brother, but in spite of him, and every other teenager. She desires to create a world solely run by children, while teenagers and adults remain under her control after destroying their favorite places. Ultimately her plan is failed and her parents take her away. Her mother reveals that, her full name is once again Lutessa "Lena" Luthor, but chooses to go by Lena.
 Lena is referenced in Young Justice: Outsiders as the current CEO of LexCorp, after Lex became Secretary General of the United Nations. Godfrey states that Lena recently announced that LexCorp will pledge funds to the Meta-Human Youth Center.

Miscellaneous
Lena Luthor appears in the second Robot Chicken DC Comics Special Robot Chicken DC Comics Special 2: Villains in Paradise, voiced by Sarah Hyland, and is portrayed as Lex Luthor's daughter, instead of his sister. Lex Luthor has her interning at the Legion of Doom's coffee shop called "Hall of Doom Coffee" during spring break since the court order says that Lex gets custody of Lena on weekends and holidays. Her plight of having to work on spring break and not being with her boyfriend is understood by Gorilla Grodd as they follow each other on a social network. When Lex finds out that Lena has snuck away to go to spring break to be with her boyfriend upon finding Scarecrow's nephew Calvin working in Lena's place, Lex pilots the Hall of Doom to a beach location to find her while the other Legion of Doom members take advantage by taking a vacation. Lex finds out that Lena's boyfriend is Superboy when he finds her after an incident where some of the Legion of Doom members mistook the Justice League's private beach for a nude beach. As Lex tells Lena that she is not to see Superboy again, Superman tells Superboy never to see Lena again. Both Lena and Superboy tell about their love romance for each other to the other heroes and villains in a song parody of "Summer Nights". As the Justice League and the Legion of Doom argue about Superboy and Lena's relationship, the group is attacked by an enlarged Starro (which was previously flushed down the Hall of Doom's toilet by Captain Cold). Starro attacked both sides and overwhelmed them until seeing Lena and Superboy in a romantic moment and stopped attacking which ended with Starro getting killed upon Green Lantern sending a boat construct with Batman in it through Starro. Lena and Superboy are later seen at the wedding of Gorilla Grodd and Bizarro.

References

External links
 Short biography on Lena Thorul – From Supermanica
 Short biography on Lena Luthor – From Supermanhomepage

DC Comics characters
DC Comics characters who have mental powers
DC Comics telekinetics
DC Comics telepaths
Comics characters introduced in 1961
Fictional empaths
Fictional characters from Kansas
Characters created by Jerry Siegel
Female characters in animation
Superman characters
DC Comics female supervillains